Igreja de São Pedro  is a church in Portugal. It is classified as a National Monument.

See also
 List of carillons

Churches in Leiria District
National monuments in Leiria District